Zhirayr Hovhannisyan (born 11 July 1981) is an Armenian Freestyle wrestler. He competed at the 2004 Summer Olympics in the men's freestyle 66 kg division and won a bronze medal at the 2009 European Wrestling Championships in Vilnius. Hovhannisyan also won a bronze medal at the 2009 European Wrestling Championships.

References

External links
 Sports-Reference.com

1981 births
Living people
People from Vanadzor
Armenian male sport wrestlers
Olympic wrestlers of Armenia
Wrestlers at the 2004 Summer Olympics
European Wrestling Championships medalists
21st-century Armenian people